1 is the debut studio album by the American indie band The Black Heart Procession.  It was released on January 1, 1998, by Headhunter Records.

Reception

Ned Raggett from AllMusic rated the album 3.5 stars out of 5 and called the album "a lovely melancholia that avoids self-pity for deliberate reflection and consideration."

Track listing
All tracks by Pall Jenkins

 "The Waiter" – 4:15
 "The Old Kind of Summer" – 4:12
 "Release My Heart" – 4:20
 "Even Thieves Couldn't Lie" – 4:47
 "Blue Water-Black Heart" – 3:47
 "Heart Without a Home" – 4:57
 "The Winter My Heart Froze" – 0:54
 "Stitched to My Heart" – 5:28
 "Square Heart" – 3:46
 "In a Tin Flask" – 4:08
 "A Heart the Size of a Horse" – 7:25

Note: First pressing of this album in LP format was on clear vinyl.

Personnel
Joe Hadlock – Mixing
Ryan Hadlock – Producer, Engineer, Mixing
Pall A. Jenkins – Organ, Guitar, Vocals, Saw, Waterphone, Layout Concept
Tobias Nathaniel – Bass, Guitar, Piano, Xylophone
Nick Ott – Photography
Mario Rubalcaba – Drums
Jason Soares – Layout Concept
Jen Wood – Vocals
Satoru Yoshioka – Photography

References

1998 debut albums
The Black Heart Procession albums